Loryniec  is a village in the administrative district of Gmina Kościerzyna, within Kościerzyna County, Pomeranian Voivodeship, in northern Poland.

Geography

History
For details of the history of the region, see History of Pomerania.

Population
The village has a population of 172.

References

Loryniec